Tarun Mandal is an Indian politician, belonging to the Socialist Unity Centre of India (Communist) and was the MP representing Jaynagar (Lok Sabha constituency) of West Bengal in the 15th Lok Sabha. He contested as an independent candidate and defeated his nearest rival Nimai Barman of RSP by 53,676 votes, receiving 48.72% of the total votes polled. He is a medical doctor and a member of the Medical Service Centre. He served as the Chief Medical Officer in Kolkata and Nasik

Books published
All in Bengali
Maranphande Janswasthya
Swasthya Bikshan
Aamar Katha-on quotations of Saratchandra
Saratchandra-Anupam Sailite Bhaswar Manisa
Saratchandra-Manisa Saili Uttaradhikar
Swasthya Aamar Adhikar
Dr. Nani Guha - Manane Smarane.

Literary, artistic, and scientific accomplishments
Written articles on educational and cultural problems, public health awareness, diseases, disaster management program related to health hazards, problems of health care delivery system of India and poetry published in journals

Social and cultural activities
Recitation, mass songs, participation in drama as actor, speech on socio-political-cultural issues and on life, works of renaissance personalities, freedom fighters, medical scientists and organised and participated in language, health and education movements.

Special interests
 Eradication of poverty, illiteracy, ill health, food crisis, housing problems, drinking water crisis of Indian population; 
 Facilitate people's movement towards change over of present society to an exploitation free socialist society; and (iii) listening to music

Sports and clubs
Participated and represented college football and cricket teams, physical exercise.

Other information
Junior Medical Officer (Er.) at Medical College, Hospital, Kolkatta, 1985–86; Medical Officer, CHS, 1986–90; Sr. Medical Officer, CHS, 1991–1995; Chief Medical Officers, CHS, 1996–2002; Chief Medical Officer (Selection Grade), ISPH, Nashik, 2002–07; Participated in disaster management works like rendered free medical services as member and leader of medical service centre, a socio-medical voluntary organisation different places for last 32 years i.e. West Bengal floods, Assam floods, Supercyclone Orissa, Kosi flood Bihar, Mumbai flood (2005), Baroda and Surat floods (2005–06), Tsunami, Andaman Nicobar Islands, Earthquake, Gujarat, Aila Cyclone, Sunderbans, West Bengal, Kolkata and Mumbai slums: Health movements organised for improvement of medical education, health care delivery system of West Bengal and India; participated in the people's resistance movement of Singur and Nandigram; and working for protection and upliftment of medical ethics and for propeople scientific health policies; Co-chairman, Vigilance and Monitoring Committee, South 24 PGS district.

References

Socialist Unity Centre of India (Communist) politicians
Living people
Indian atheists
Indian communists
India MPs 2009–2014
1959 births
People from Jaynagar Majilpur
University of Calcutta alumni
Lok Sabha members from West Bengal
People from South 24 Parganas district
Independent politicians in India